Olufemi David Olaleye was a Nigerian professor of virology at the University of Ibadan. He was the head of the Clinical Virology Laboratory, that was used to carried out COVID-19 tests during the pandemic. He was a director, WHO National Influenza Centre, University College Hospital, Ibadan.

Early life and education 
Prof. David Olaleye was born on July 21, 1954 into the family of Mr James and Mrs Esther Olaleye in Ogbomosho, Oyo State, Nigeria.He obtained his West Africa Senior School Certificate from Ogbomoso High School, Ogbomoso in 1972. In 1975 he obtained a   Certificate in Animal Health from University of Ife. A degree in Veterinary medicine from University of Ibadan in 1975, Masters degree and Doctorate degree in 1985 and 1995 from the same University.

Career 
Prof. David Olaleye started his career in University of Ibadan as a resident veterinary officer (pathology) in 1982. He became a lecturer in 1986 and rose through the ranks of senior lecturer in 1989 to a professor of virology in 1995. In 2006 he was appointed as dean of Faculty of Basic Medical Sciences, College of Medicine, University of Ibadan, he was also a four-time head of department, Department of Virology of the same institution and in 2010 he became an adjunct professor at  Northwestern University, Chicago, Illinois.

Fellowship and membership 
Olaleye was a Fellow of the Fogarty International Fellowship Program, a member of African Academy of Science (FAAS) and the America Science Honors Society (Sigma Xi).

Death 
Olaleye died on Tuesday 27 July 2021 after a battling with COVID-19 complications. He was buried  at the Anglican Cemetery, Ido, along Eruwa Road in July 29, 2021.

References 

Living people
1954 births
University of Ibadan alumni